Kristian Haynes (born 20 December 1980) is a Swedish manager and former footballer who played as a midfielder. He's currently the manager of Trelleborgs FF.

Coaching career
On 21 October 2019, Haynes was appointed caretaker manager of Trelleborgs FF for the second time, this time after the departure of Peter Swärdh. The club announced on 13 November 2019, that Haynes would continue in charge on a permanent basis.

References

External links 

1980 births
Living people
Swedish footballers
Swedish football managers
AIK Fotboll players
Trelleborgs FF players
Mjällby AIF players
Allsvenskan players
Superettan players
Association football midfielders
Trelleborgs FF managers
Footballers from Malmö